Price is a town and locality on Yorke Peninsula in South Australia.

History and development
The township, which was proclaimed on 3 August 1882, is near the northern boundary of the Hundred of Cunningham.

It was named by Sir William Jervois, Governor of South Australia 1877–83, after his daughter in law, Florence Annie Price, who married John Jervois, his eldest son. She was a daughter of Henry Strong Price, a pioneer pastoralist of the Flinders Ranges.

Boundaries for the locality were created on 27 May 1999 for the "long established name."

The principal local industries are grain farming and salt production. Cheetham Salt owns the operations.

Tourism facilities are limited to the Wheatsheaf Hotel, established 1886, and a caravan park.

Wills Creek

Although not right on the coast, Price has a causeway running to a mangrove-fringed tidal creek, Wills Creek, which connects it with the sea (Gulf St Vincent). At the end of the causeway there is a public boat ramp. Once outside the creek, fishing is plentiful.

Wills Creek is a very sheltered anchorage for boats and, in earlier times, it was from here that bagged salt and grain was loaded onto ketches for export. These products are now transported in bulk form by road. A 1911 newspaper reported that most of the ketches visiting Price via Wills Creek had, on at least one visit, suffered the inconvenience of being stuck in the mud of the creek at low tide.

See also
 Hundred of Price
 Wills Creek Conservation Park
 Gulf St Vincent Important Bird Area

References

Towns in South Australia
Yorke Peninsula
Gulf St Vincent